Kanawha County is a county in the U.S. state of West Virginia. As of the 2020 census, the population was 180,745, making it West Virginia's most populous county. The county seat is Charleston, which is also the state capital.
Kanawha County is part of the Charleston, WV Metropolitan Statistical Area.

History
The county began taking formation on November 14, 1788, under the authorization of the Virginia General Assembly and was founded on October 5, 1789. The county was named for the Kanawha River, which in turn was named after a Native American tribe that lived in the area. During the American Civil War, a number of state infantry and cavalry regiments were organized in the county for both Confederate Army and Union Army service.

In 1863 West Virginia's counties were divided into civil townships, with the intention of encouraging local government.  This proved impractical in the heavily rural state, and in 1872 the townships were converted into magisterial districts.  Kanawha County was divided into ten districts: Big Sandy, Cabin Creek, Charleston, Elk, Jefferson, Loudon, Malden, Poca, Union, and Washington.  In the 1970s the historic districts were consolidated into five new magisterial districts: District 1, District 2, District 3, District 4, and District 5.  A District 6 was created in the 1980s, but in the 1990s the county was redistricted again, reducing the number of magisterial districts to four: District 1, District 2, District 3, and District 4.

Kanawha County was the site of a bloody miners' strike in 1912, and a school textbook controversy in 1974, that resulted in bombings, and received national attention.

Geography
It is the fourth-largest county in West Virginia by area.

Adjacent counties

Roane County (north)
Clay County (northeast)
Nicholas County (east)
Fayette County (east)
Raleigh County (southeast)
Boone County (south)
Lincoln County (southwest)
Putnam County (west)
Jackson County (northwest)

Major highways

 Interstate 64
 Interstate 77
 Interstate 79
 U.S. Route 60
 U.S. Route 119
 West Virginia Route 4
 West Virginia Route 25
 West Virginia Route 34
 West Virginia Route 61
 West Virginia Route 62
 West Virginia Route 94
 West Virginia Route 114
 West Virginia Route 214
 West Virginia Route 501
 West Virginia Route 601
 West Virginia Route 622
 West Virginia Route 817

Demographics

2000 census
As of the census of 2000, there were 200,073 people, 86,226 households, and 55,960 families living in the county.  The population density was 222 people per square mile (86/km2).  There were 93,788 housing units at an average density of 104 per square mile (40/km2).  The racial makeup of the county was 90.46% White, 6.97% Black or African American, 0.21% Native American, 0.85% Asian, 0.02% Pacific Islander, 0.21% from other races, and 1.27% from two or more races.  0.59% of the population were Hispanics or Latinos of any race.

There were 86,226 households, out of which 26.50% had children under the age of 18 living with them, 49.00% were married couples living together, 12.30% had a female householder with no husband present, and 35.10% were non-families. 30.80% of all households were made up of individuals, and 12.50% had someone living alone who was 65 years of age or older.  The average household size was 2.28 and the average family size was 2.84.

The age distribution was 21.30% under the age of 18, 8.40% from 18 to 24, 28.10% from 25 to 44, 25.60% from 45 to 64, and 16.50% who were 65 years of age or older.  The median age was 40 years. For every 100 females, there were 90.70 males.  For every 100 females age 18 and over, there were 87.10 males.

The median income for a household in the county was $33,766, and the median income for a family was $42,568. Males had a median income of $33,842 versus $24,188 for females. The per capita income for the county was $20,354.  About 11.20% of families and 14.40% of the population were below the poverty line, including 20.60% of those under age 18 and 10.50% of those age 65 or over.

2010 census
As of the 2010 United States census, there were 193,063 people, 84,201 households, and 52,172 families living in the county. The racial makeup of the county was 89.1% white, 7.3% black or African American, 1.0% Asian, 0.2% American Indian, 0.3% from other races, and 2.0% from two or more races. Those of Hispanic or Latino origin made up 0.9% of the population. In terms of ancestry, 14.8% were German, 14.2% were Irish, 13.9% were English, and 13.4% were American.

Of the 84,201 households, 27.1% had children under the age of 18 living with them, 44.3% were married couples living together, 13.1% had a female householder with no husband present, 38.0% were non-families, and 32.5% of all households were made up of individuals. The average household size was 2.26 and the average family size was 2.84. The median age was 42.4 years.

The median income for a household in the county was $42,669 and the median income for a family was $54,203. Males had a median income of $42,522 versus $31,754 for females. The per capita income for the county was $25,439. About 9.7% of families and 13.7% of the population were below the poverty line, including 20.5% of those under age 18 and 8.3% of those age 65 or over.

Politics
Kanawha County was dominated by the Democratic Party for much of the 20th century, albeit to a lesser extent than much of West Virginia. Since 2004 it has been won by Republicans in presidential elections, although, as an urban county, the swing to the Republicans has not been as vast as in much of the rest of the state. The county seat and state capital of Charleston is heavily Democratic.

Elected officials

Economy
According to the 2010 U.S. Census, there are approximately 5,481 private sector businesses within Kanawha County.  There are 89,768 people who are currently employed who live in Kanawha County.

Recreation

Events
 FestivALL
Charleston Sternwheel Regatta (Returning 2022)
 Live on the Levee
 Vandalia Gathering
 Rib Fest
 Charleston Rod Run Doo Wop
 Majorette Festival - Daily Mail Kanawha County Majorette and Band Festival
 Pinch Reunion
 St. Albans Festival of Lights

Attractions
 Clay Center (West Virginia)
 West Virginia State Capitol
 West Virginia Cultural Center
 South Charleston Mound
 Mardi Gras Casino and Resort
 Charleston Civic Center
 Heritage Tower Museum

Sports
 Charleston Dirty Birds - Baseball team 
 West Virginia United - Soccer club

Communities

Cities

Charleston (county seat)
Dunbar
Marmet
Montgomery (part)
Nitro (part)
Smithers (part)
South Charleston
St. Albans

Towns

Belle
Cedar Grove
Chesapeake
Clendenin
East Bank
Glasgow
Handley
Pratt

Magisterial districts

District 1
District 2
District 3
District 4

Census-designated places

Alum Creek (part)
Big Chimney
Chelyan
Coal Fork
Cross Lanes
Elkview
Jefferson
Pinch
Rand
Shrewsbury
Sissonville
Tornado

Unincorporated communities

Aarons
Acme
Acup
Airport Village
Amandaville
Amelia
Annfred
Arborland Acres
Barren Creek
Blackhawk
Blakeley
Blount
Blue Creek
Blundon
Bream
Brounland
Burnwell
Cabin Creek
Carbon
Cinco
Coalburg
Coalridge
Coco
Corton
Crede
Crown Hill
Davis Creek
Dawes
Decota
Dial
Diamond
Dickinson
Donwood
Dry Branch
Dungriff
Dupont City
East Nitro
East Side
Edgewood
Elk
Elk Forest
Elk Hills
Emmons (part)
Eskdale
Etowah
Falling Rock
Ferrell
Fivemile
Forest Hills
Forks of Coal
Fort Hill
Frame
Gallagher
Giles
Green Valley
Greencastle
Grippe
Guthrie
Hansford
Hernshaw
Hicumbottom
Highlawn
Hillsdale
Hitop
Holly
Hollygrove
Hollyhurst
Hugheston
Institute
Island Branch
Ivydale
Jarrett
Jarretts Ford
Joplin
Kanawha Estates
Kayford
Kelly Hill
Kendalia
Laing
Leewood
Loudendale
Lower Falls
Malden
Mammoth
Meadowbrook
Mink Shoals
Pocatalico
Pond Gap
Port Amherst
Putney
Quick
Quincy
River Bend
Rocky Fork
Rock Lake Village
Rutledge
Sanderson
Tyler Heights
Tyler Mountain

Notable people
 Robert Alexander, NFL football player
 Anthony Bass, NFL football player
 George Crumb, composer
 Aaron Dobson, Super Bowl champion football player
 Ryan Dorsey, actor
 Jon Elmore, NBA basketball player
 Conchata Ferrell, actress and three-time Primetime Emmy Award nominee, best known for her role as Berta on Two and a Half Men
 Jennifer Garner, actress and Golden Globe and SAG award winner
 Elizabeth Harden Gilmore, business leader and civil rights advocate
 Gary Gregor, NBA basketball player
 Alex Hawkins, two-time NFL champion football player
 Alexis Hornbuckle, two-time WNBA champion basketball player
 T. D. Jakes, megachurch pastor
 Carl Lee, NFL football player
 Earl Lloyd, Basketball Hall of Fame inductee and the first African-American basketball player to play in an NBA game
 Kathy Mattea, country music and bluegrass singer
 Renee Montgomery, two-time WNBA champion basketball player
 Randy Moss, Pro Football Hall of Fame inductee and holder of the NFL record for receiving touchdowns in a season
 Lou Myers, actor, best known for his role as Vernon Gaines on A Different World
 Les Palmer, NFL champion football player
 Phil Pfister, strongman competitor and winner of the 2006 World's Strongest Man competition
 Kristen Ruhlin, actress
 Ryan Switzer, NFL football player
 Booker T. Washington, highly influential educator, author, orator, presidential advisor, and co-founder of the Tuskegee Institute
 Jerry West, Basketball Hall of Fame inductee, nine-time NBA champion as both a player and an executive, and the basis for the silhouette on the NBA logo since 1971
 Jason Williams, an American former professional basketball player who was a point guard in the National Basketball Association (NBA) for twelve seasons

See also
 National Register of Historic Places listings in Kanawha County, West Virginia
 Kanawha County textbook controversy

Footnotes

References

Further reading
 Scott A. MacKenzie. "The Slaveholders' War: The Secession Crisis in Kanawha County, Western Virginia, 1860-1861," West Virginia History: A Journal of Regional Studies - New Series, Volume 4, Number 1, Spring 2010, pp. 33–57 in Project MUSE

External links
Kanawha County Commission
Kanawha County Public Library
Kanawha County Schools
WVGenWeb Kanawha County
Kanawha County Obituary Archive

Convention & Visitors Bureau
 Charleston, WV - http://www.charlestonwv.com/ 
 Dunbar, WV - http://www.wvcommerce.org/travel/travelplanner/attraction/Dunbar-Convention-and-Visitors-Bureau-CVB/3843/default.aspx  
 Nitro, WV - https://web.archive.org/web/20130727150319/http://nitrowvcvb.org/ 
 South Charleston, WV - https://web.archive.org/web/20121019071540/http://www.southcharlestonwv.org/SCCVB/Welcome.html

 
1789 establishments in Virginia
Populated places established in 1789
Charleston, West Virginia metropolitan area
Counties of Appalachia